Vasant Tapu Harji Chavda, usually known as Vasant Tapu (1936-1988) was a Tanzanian cricketer. A left-handed batsman and left-arm fast-medium/left-arm orthodox spin bowler, he played for the Tanzania national cricket team between 1967 and 1974 and also played first-class cricket for East Africa.

Biography
Born in Tanganyika in 1936, Vasant Tapu began to play international cricket in August 1967 with two matches against India. The first was for Tanzania in Dar es Salaam and the second was a first-class match for East Africa in Kampala. In the first-class match, he scored 55 in the East Africa first innings and took 5/72 in the Indian first innings, his best batting and bowling performances in first-class cricket.

He played in the East African Quadrangular tournament in 1969 and 1970, and again in 1971, 1972 and 1974 when it had become a triangular tournament. He also went on a tour of England with East Africa in 1972. His last match for Tanzania was against Zambia in August 1974, and he had played his second and final first-class match earlier in the year, against the MCC in Nairobi. He died in 1988.

References

1936 births
1988 deaths
East African cricketers
Tanzanian cricketers